Ingolstadt Nord station (also called the Nordbahnhof in German, meaning "North station") is the second operational passenger station in the town of Ingolstadt, in the state of Bavaria in southern Germany. The other station is Ingolstadt Hauptbahnhof.

The station is entered in the official list of Deutsche Bahn station abbreviations as MIN and is classified by Deutsche Bahn as a category 3 station. The station is overseen by the station management at Rosenheim.

Operationals importance 
The new high-speed railway from Ingolstadt to Nuremberg branches off the old Munich–Ingolstadt–Treuchtlingen (timetable no. KBS 990). The high-speed tracks begin turning out even within the station limits in order to run into the Audi Tunnel which is immediately next to the station. There is also a heavily used goods siding which branches off to the refineries that are located in the eastern part of the city.

Passenger services 
The Nordbahnhof is only served by regional train services: the Regionalexpress (RE) and  Regionalbahn (RB) trains. Intercity-Express (ICE) and InterCity (IC) trains pass through without stopping. A summary of passenger services at the station is shown in the table below:

In addition several extra trains are laid on during rush hours between Ingolstadt Nord and Eichstätt and between Ingolstadt Nord and Munich.
Because the Nordbahnhof, unlike the Hauptbahnhof, is located close to the town centre and not far from the Audi factory, it is used particularly by schoolchildren, students and Audi employees travelling to and from the area.

Goods traffic 
Goods traffic plays a major role at Ingolstadt Nord. Numerous goods trains arrive with manufacturing parts for the Audi factory. These trains are detached in the station and shunted into the car manufacturer's industrial sidings. The factory has an extensive set of tracks that are busy around the clock.

In Ingolstadt Nord there is also a branch line, several kilometres long, that is still used by goods traffic. This splits again at the edge of the town into various goods sidings leading to two oil refineries and the InterPark industrial estate.

Infrastructure 
The station has an extensive track system which includes five tracks with platforms (nos. 3 to 7) and which are used by passenger trains. Tracks 4 and 5 belong to the new high-speed route and only trains of the Munich-Nuremberg Express stop here. All platforms have a height of 76 cm. Tracks 3, 6 and 7 are 270 m long; tracks 4 and 5 are  only 170 m long. All platforms have lifts; platforms 4 and 5 are only partly suitable for wheelchairs due to their steep slopes. Apart from 3 ticket machines, two snack vending machines and a toilet block there are no services at the station.

The station building, dating from 1869/1870, and the station forecourt are currently (2007) in poor structural condition. In the near future, however, a conversion is planned which should see the town of Ingolstadt purchasing the station building from  Deutsche Bahn, and converting it into a cultural centre. However, there are no firm plans yet. In addition, there is a plan to build a multi-storey car park with 290 bays and an integrated kiosk, which will greatly improve the parking situation for travellers. It was announced that the necessary real estate would be bought in September or October 2007 and that work would begin in spring 2008.

See also 
Royal Bavarian State Railways
List of railway stations in Bavaria

References

External links 
Platform information on the DB website

Railway stations in Bavaria
Buildings and structures in Ingolstadt
Railway stations in Germany opened in 1869
Railway stations in Germany opened in 1870
1869 establishments in Bavaria